Sara Botsford (born August 4, 1951) is a Canadian television and film actress. She starred in the CTV drama series E.N.G. (1989-1994) for which received Canadian Screen Award for Best Actress in a Continuing Leading Dramatic Role.

Career
She is probably best known for her role of Ann Hildebrand in the television series E.N.G. for which she won a Gemini Award for Best Performance by an Actress in a Continuing Leading Dramatic Role. Before this role, her most remembered role is the wickedly evil character of Lillith McKechnie, AKA Isabella, on the daytime drama As the World Turns from 1988 to 1990. In Dangerous Offender: The Marlene Moore Story (1996), she portrayed Marlene Moore's (Brooke Johnson) lawyer. In 2002, she portrayed Kathleen Sinclair in the TV movie Trudeau about the life of the late Prime Minister Pierre Elliott Trudeau. In 2003 she appeared in Burn: The Robert Wraight Story.

Her film roles have included appearances in Crossbar (1979), By Design, Murder by Phone, Deadly Eyes, the Hitchcockian thriller Still of the Night (all 1982), Legal Eagles (1986), Jumpin' Jack Flash (1986), and The Gunrunner (1989), opposite Kevin Costner. More recently she played a hotel owner in the American Old West in Tremors 4: The Legend Begins (2004), and Kathy Williams in the remake of The Fog (2005). She played Marilla Cuthbert in the 2016 Anne of Green Gables TV movie, opposite Martin Sheen, and its two sequels.

Personal life
Botsford and Alan Scarfe had one child. Her son Jonathan is also an actor. Her only marriage was to James Hurdle with whom she had two sons, Gideon and Quinn. She currently lives with Christopher "CB" Brown, with whom she has a theatre company, 49th Parallel Theatre. Their mandate is to produce Canadian plays and adaptations for an American audience. They are based in Los Angeles. They also are the creators of the award-winning web series Those Damn Canadians, starring Christopher Shyer and Lynda Boyd.

Filmography

Film

Television

References

External links

1951 births
Canadian film actresses
Canadian television actresses
Best Actress in a Drama Series Canadian Screen Award winners
Living people
People from Timiskaming District
Actresses from Ontario
20th-century Canadian actresses
21st-century Canadian actresses